Raise It Up is the second album by StillWell. The album was released on November 13, 2015 through Rat Pak Records.

Overview 
Throughout 2014, the band later started demoing tracks and by the end of the year they began to refine their sound. The band signed with Rat Pak Records in 2015 and began working with producer Chris "Wizard" Collier. The band released a single for "Mess I Made" along with a music video on October 1, 2015. On November 5, 2015, the band released their music video under their eponymous album.

Track listing

Charts

Personnel 
StillWell
 Q-Unique - lead vocals
 Reginald "Fieldy" Arvizu - lead guitars
 Pablo "Spider" Silva - bass
 Noah "Wuv" Bernardo - drums, percussion

Additional personnel
 Chris "Wizard" Collier - producer, engineer, mixing

References 

StillWell albums
2015 albums